Bornito de Sousa Baltazar Diogo (born 23 July 1953) is an Angolan politician who was the vice president of Angola, from 2017 to 2022. He was the vice presidential candidate for the MPLA in the 2017 Angolan general election, running alongside João Lourenço and a member of the Constituent Assembly since 2010. He was officially sworn in as vice president on 26 September 2017.

Early life and education
De Sousa was born in Quéssua municipality. His father, Job Baltazar Diogo, was a primary school teacher, Quimbundo-Portuguese translator and once imprisoned by the Portuguese security agency, PIDE-DGS. His mother, Catarina Manuel Simão Bento "Katika", was a housewife.

He studied at the "Amor e Alegria" Primary School, at Quéssua Methodist Mission in Malanje and the United Methodist Church School in Luanda. He also attended the Liceu Nacional Salvador Correia de Sá e Benevides in Luanda. He obtained a degree in law from Agostinho Neto University and a science degree from Escola Superior do Partido.

Political career
He started as a MPLA militant in Luanda (Marçal district) at the age of 16, in 1969, influenced by the events happening in neighbouring Congo, the arrest of his father, Job Baltazar Diogo, and his 
maternal uncle, Dr. Luís Micolo. He was imprisoned at St Paul prison in Luanda and São Nicolau (present-day Cape Verde) by the PIDE from January 1971 to May 1974. He was released in May 1974 after the 25 April Revolution, together with his brother, General Baltazar Diogo Cristóvão. He started his career by serving as the first National Secretary of the JMPLA. In 1976, he became the political commissar of the Angolan Armed Forces.

He was the president of the Constitutional Commission of the National Assembly, that was responsible for drafting the 2010 Angolan constitution. He was also the president of the MPLA Parliamentary Group until February 2010, when he was named Minister of Territorial Administration on 2 February 2010, and was reappointed to the office on 1 October 2012, after the 2012 elections.

Personal life
He was married to Maria José Rodrigues Ferreira Diogo. and has 4 daughters: Nhenze Mpasi Diogo Mendes, Njolela Chili Diogo, Djamila do Carmo Diogo and Naulila Katika Diogo Graça.

References

|-

Living people
1953 births
Vice presidents of Angola
Territory Administration ministers of Angola
MPLA politicians